A track circuit interrupter may be fitted at catch points, trap points or buffer stops to maintain a track circuit in the 'occupied' state in the event of a derailment. The track circuit remains de-energised until the interrupter is replaced.

Application

At catch or trap points 
Trap points or catch points are designed to intentionally derail vehicles making an unauthorised movement. When a vehicle derails completely, its wheels cease to shunt the track circuit. Since the vehicle might still be foul of the track, it is important to maintain the track circuit in the 'occupied' state. To achieve this, a cast iron interrupter is fitted to one of the run-off rails such that it will be struck by the wheels of a vehicle that is about to be derailed. Since the track circuit is bonded via the interrupter, it is proved to be intact when the track circuit relay is energised.

At buffer stops 
A track circuit interrupter may be fitted behind a friction buffer stop. In the event of the buffer stop being struck by a train and pushed along, an adjacent line may potentially be fouled. Breaking the interrupter causes the adjacent track circuit to show 'occupied' until the interrupter is replaced.

Insulated and non-insulated interrupters 
Originally, track circuit interrupters were directly connected to the rail, both physically and electrically. One of the track circuit tail cables would be connected to the interrupter, it being connected to the rail. If the interrupter was broken, it was possible that the broken part, with cable still attached, could drop onto the rail and allow the track circuit to remain energised and show 'clear'. To overcome this, it is now practice for track circuit interrupters to be insulated from the rail to which they are attached. A track circuit cable is taken via the interrupter, with one end connected to the upper part of it and another end to the lower part. The cable is at opposite polarity to the rail, therefore should the broken part of the interrupter drop onto the rail, the track circuit will be short circuited and show 'occupied'.

Provision of Overlaps, Flank Protection and Trapping 

GK/RT0011 specifies the requirements for the provision of track circuit interrupters. Where vehicles derailed at trap points could foul lines other than the ...

Diagram 
 

In the UK, the interrupter is shown on signal box diagrams as two closed triangles inside the points.

Accidents

Melton Mowbray 
On 9 February 2006, a freight train derailed at trap points at the end of the Up Goods Loop at Brentingby Junction, near Melton Mowbray, after the train passed a signal at danger.

Treadles 

Track circuit interrupters are similar to treadles, the main difference being that interrupters remain open circuit once opened, whereas treadles reclose after activation.

References 

Train detection systems